Bouramayah (Bouramaya) is a village in the Tanéné sub-prefecture, Dubréka Prefecture of Guinea. It is the home village of the family of the former Guinean president General Lansana Conté.

History

The town became the seat of power of the Fernandez Dynasty from the 1780s. In 1885 King William Fernandez received Jean-Marie Bayol, the French lieutenant-governor of Senegal, in charge of the Rivières du Sud region, on an official visit to the town.

References

Populated places in the Kindia Region